The UKL platform (Untere Klasse, "lower class" in German) is a modular automobile platform developed by German car manufacturer BMW. It is a modular architecture to suit a range of front-wheel-drive and all-wheel drive models.

The objective of the front-wheel-drive UKL platform is to offer smaller models with a large interior space, with enough room for passengers in the rear seats and large cargo space. These objectives are only possible to achieve by mounting transverse three or four-cylinder engines. At the time of release, BMW announced that any model under  in length and smaller than a 3 Series will make use of the UKL platform. According to Ian Robertson, BMW sales and marketing chief, "One of the big advantages of UKL is that we are able to launch a lot of products almost simultaneously because we are doing the engineering at once."

The platform has two derivatives: the UKL1 and UKL2. The first production vehicle to use the UKL platform is the 2014 Mini Hatch. Another UKL platform derivative is the FAAR platform which was announced in 2017. It is designed with pure ICE, hybrid and electric powertrains in mind.

UKL1 platform 
Vehicles using platform (calendar years):
 Mini Hatch (F56) (2014–present)
 Mini Hatch 5-door (F55) (2014–present)
 Mini Convertible (F57) (2016–present)

UKL2 platform 
The UKL2 platform is the larger version of the UKL platform. It debuted with the BMW 2 Series Active Tourer in 2014.

Vehicles using platform (calendar years):
 BMW 1 Series Sedan (F52) (2017–present)
 BMW 1 Series (F40) (2019–present)
 BMW 2 Series Gran Coupé (F44) (2019–present)
BMW 2 Series Active Tourer (F45) (2014–2021)
 BMW 2 Series Gran Tourer (F46) (2015–2021)
 BMW 2 Series Active Tourer (U06) (2021–present)
 BMW X1 (F48) (2015–2022)
 BMW X1 (U11) (2022-present)
 BMW X2 (F39) (2017–present)
 Mini Countryman (F60) (2017–present)
Mini Clubman (F54) (2016–present)
Zinoro 60H (F48) (2017–present)

See also 

 BMW CLAR platform

References 

Car platforms